Deerhunter is an American indie rock band from Atlanta, Georgia, formed in 2001. The band currently consists of Bradford Cox (vocals, guitar, keyboards), Moses Archuleta (drums, electronics, sound treatments), Lockett Pundt (guitar, vocals, keyboards), Josh McKay (bass) and Javier Morales (keyboards, synthesizers, alto saxophone).

Founded by Cox and Archuleta, Deerhunter's first stable line-up included guitarist Colin Mee and bass guitarist Justin Bosworth. After recording a split EP with Alphabets, Bosworth died on March 29, 2004, of head injuries suffered during a skateboarding accident. He was 23 years old. The band recorded their first studio album, Turn It Up Faggot (2005), with Josh Fauver occupying the vacant role of bass guitarist. Following the album's release, Cox asked childhood friend, Lockett Pundt, to join Deerhunter as a song-writing partner, second guitarist, and occasional lead vocalist.

Recorded in two days, the band's follow-up, Cryptograms (2007), combined ambient work and more angular garage rock songs. The release was quickly followed by the EP, Fluorescent Grey. While touring the releases, Mee departed from Deerhunter, due to disagreements over the band's schedule, but rejoined soon after. Deerhunter released two studio albums, Microcastle and Weird Era Cont., in 2008. Both albums were recorded without the participation of Mee, who again departed for a second and final time. The band enlisted former cheerleader and high school friend of Cox, Whitney Petty, as his touring replacement.

Recorded as a four-piece with producer Ben H. Allen and engineer David Barbe the band's fourth studio album, Halcyon Digest (2010), was released to widespread critical acclaim, ranked as Pitchfork's 29th and Stereogum's 78th best album of the decade. In 2012, the departure of long-time bassist Fauver placed the band's future in doubt. Cox, Pundt and Archuleta regrouped with new members, bassist Josh McKay and guitarist Frankie Broyles, to record the primitivist garage rock and musique concrète-influenced Monomania (2013). The album expanded on a darker and more disturbing sound, complete with treated tape recordings of rats and insects, exploring themes of disassociation and mental illness.

The following year, Cox was struck by a vehicle while walking his dog near his home in Atlanta's Grant Park. During his recovery and rehabilitation he focused on writing songs resulting in the album Fading Frontier (2015).

Deerhunter have described themselves as "ambient punk," though they incorporate a wide range of genres, including noise, garage rock, art rock, as well as significant pop elements.

History

2001–2005: Formation and Turn It Up Faggot
The band was co-founded in 2001 by vocalist Bradford Cox and drummer and keyboardist Moses Archuleta. The name Deerhunter (which Cox has repeatedly remarked upon despising) was chosen by the band's first drummer, Dan Walton. Cox did not care then what the band was called as he thought it to be just another temporary art project. The band was joined by Colin Mee, whom Cox met while Mee was living at the Atlanta label Die Slaughterhaus Records with members of Black Lips. The two bonded over a shared interest in Dada and 20th Century Composers Olivier Messiaen and György Ligeti, as well as British bands The Fall, The Raincoats, and Cabaret Voltaire. In 2004 the group's first bassist, Justin Bosworth, died of head injuries suffered in a skateboarding accident at age 24. He appeared on only one Deerhunter release, the Deerhunter/Alphabets Split, issued before their debut album. Joshua Fauver, of Atlanta punk band Electrosleep International, then took up the position as bassist. Deerhunter's first album, Turn It Up Faggot, was "the result of a lot of negativity". After the band finished the album, in an indication of how difficult it was to record in the wake of his bandmate's death, Cox said "I don't ever want to make this album again". The album's liner notes are dedicated to Bosworth. After the release of Turn It Up Faggot, Cox asked his best friend from high school, Lockett Pundt, to join the band.

2005–2007: Cryptograms and Fluorescent Grey EP
The band, now featuring Pundt's reverb-saturated guitar sound, went on tour, playing shows with the likes of Lightning Bolt and Gang Gang Dance. This tour culminated in a recording session engineered by acclaimed folk musician Samara Lubelski at Rare Book Room, New York City. This session failed to produce anything that could be used, due to Cox's mental and physical state at the time, as well as technical disagreements that emerged with Lubelski. Cox has kept a copy of the sessions on "a scratched CD-R under my bed" and has stated that "nobody will ever hear them". In spite of Cox's claim excerpts from those sessions were later posted as a free download on the band's blog. The band returned to the same studio where they recorded their first album outside Athens, Georgia and decided to give recording their second album another attempt. This was partly due to advice received from the band Liars, who encouraged them to re-record it.

It took only two days in November 2005 for the band to record their second album, entitled Cryptograms. In 2006, before its release, Pitchfork Media added "Spring Hall Convert", a song from the record, to its "Infinite Mix Tape series". The album was released by Kranky in January 2007. The album revealed a more subdued and introverted sound for the band. As with their first album, Cryptograms also had a dedication inside the album's liner notes, this time to a friend of Cox's, Bradley Ira Harris, a heroin addict who died in 2005.

On May 8, 2007, the group released the Fluorescent Grey EP, which was recorded in July 2006. The EP featured more use of rudimentary keyboards, bells, and pianos.

On August 29, 2007, the group became a quartet with the loss of guitarist Colin Mee. Mee departed because he "...couldn't make it to a couple of shows we had booked next weekend and that was unacceptable to certain bandmates". Mee rejoined the band four months later, but departed the band for the final time before 2008.

2007–2009: Microcastle/Weird Era Cont. and Rainwater Cassette Exchange EP
Deerhunter contributed the song "After Class" to Living Bridge, a compilation put together by Rare Book Room Records. The song was recorded in the same place where they attempted to record their second album. They returned to Rare Book Room studios in April 2008 to record "Oh, It's Such A Shame," a Jay Reatard cover that would be released as a split single with Reatard himself covering the Fluorescent Grey title track. In the same month they recorded their next album, Microcastle. Prior to the announced release date for the LP, the band continued to tour, with one date opening for The Smashing Pumpkins and a select of fall shows opening for Nine Inch Nails.

The quartet's third offering, Microcastle, was set to be released on October 27, 2008, although it became available through peer-to peer networks in late May. In an attempt to reward fans who awaited for the street date, the group reconvened to record a new album of material, Weird Era Cont., which later leaked before its street date also. However, Microcastle did manage to debut at No. 123 on the Billboard 200, a first for Deerhunter. Mee left the band again, for the final time, and the band enlisted former cheerleader and high school friend of Cox, Whitney Petty, as his touring replacement.

While touring the Microcastle album in the UK, Cox booked an evening in a studio and recorded what would become the On Platts Eyott cassette. This was released in two batches of 100 copies each; an edition of pink cassettes was given out to competition winners by his record label and orange cassettes were sold at a special Halloween concert in Atlanta on October 31, 2008. In a comment left on the Deerhunter blog on February 28, Cox announced that Whitney Petty was no longer a member of the band, stating:

While on tour, the band managed to release Rainwater Cassette Exchange, an EP of songs written during the Microcastle sessions, and "Vox Celeste 5," a Sub Pop single of songs from Weird Era Cont. and Microcastle. To promote the releases, they embarked on a short summer trek with No Age and Dan Deacon as the "No Deachunter Tour." Later during a performance at All Tomorrow's Parties 2009 Music Festival in September (curated by The Flaming Lips), Bradford Cox announced that the band will be going on hiatus to "devote time to some other things," calling the show their last "for a long time." During the hiatus, Bradford Cox continued with Atlas Sound and released his second album Logos, Josh Fauver resumed work with his record label Army of Bad Luck, Moses Archuleta enrolled in culinary school, and Lockett Pundt performed some shows in celebration of The Floodlight Collective, his debut album as Lotus Plaza released in March of that year.

2010–2012: Halcyon Digest

In early January, it was revealed that the group would serve as openers on the upcoming Spoon tour to promote their album Transference. Along with the Spoon tour, the group also announced some shows of their own, including stops at the 2010 Coachella Valley Music and Arts Festival, and All Tomorrow's Parties (curated by Simpsons creator, Matt Groening.) During these shows, the band began to debut some new material, including the songs "Helicopter," "Primitive 3D," "Fountain Stairs" and "Revival," all of which would end up being recorded for their next studio session to follow.

In June, Deerhunter took a short break from touring to record Halcyon Digest. Initial news of the album became public when music industry firm, Milk Money, posted a message on their Twitter account that the band had been mixing the new record with Ben Allen (who also worked on Animal Collective's Merriweather Post Pavilion and Fall Be Kind EP.) A week later the band launched a new website, where they announced the title and release date of the LP, along with a guerilla style marketing campaign. The first single, "Revival," was made available to fans who had assisted the band with promotion for the new album through a link via official email. In the same month, director John Albrecht posted a trailer for an upcoming live video on his Vimeo page set to be released later in the year.

In 2012, it was announced that Deerhunter was to provide an original score to The Curve of Forgotten Things, a short film by the fashion line Rodarte starring Elle Fanning. That same year, bassist Josh Fauver left the band via email in 2012, just prior to the recording of Monomania.

2013–2014: Monomania
On March 22, 2013, Deerhunter announced their sixth studio album would be released on May 7, 2013. The album, entitled Monomania, was recorded in New York with frequent collaborator and producer Nicolas Vernhes at his Rare Book Room Studio, where Microcastle and Parallax were taped. For Monomania, Josh McKay took over bass duties, and Atlanta native Frankie Broyles was brought in to play guitar. Deerhunter's press release described the record as "nocturnal garage" while having an avant garde context. On April 2, 2013, the band performed the song "Monomania" on Late Night with Jimmy Fallon.

Deerhunter headlined and curated the All Tomorrow's Parties music festival held at Pontins holiday camp in Camber Sands, England from the June 21–23, 2013. At the event they performed the Cryptograms, Microcastle & Halcyon Digest albums in full, with Atlas Sound also performing. Deerhunter was announced as a headliner at Austin Psych Fest, the 6th annual festival held April 26–28, 2013, Heineken Primavera Sound (Barcelona), Optimus Primavera Sound (Porto), and perform live at Dancity Festival (Foligno, Italy) along with FYF Fest in Los Angeles during 2015. Deerhunter have also been asked to play at the Meredith Music Festival this December in Victoria, Australia.

On December 4, 2014, frontman Bradford Cox was seriously injured and hospitalized after being hit by a car in Atlanta, GA.

2015–2017: Fading Frontier
On August 16, 2015, Deerhunter released a video for a new song titled "Snakeskin," and announced that their new album, Fading Frontier, was released on October 16, 2015, on the 4AD label. The song featured alto saxophonist Zumi Rosow and the video was directed by Valentina Tapia. On October 13, Deerhunter shared the video for 'Living My Life', dedicated to Miles Davis. The LP was very well received by critics.

2018–present: Double Dream of Spring and Why Hasn’t Everything Already Disappeared?
In 2018, the band released a cassette-only studio album during their Spring 2018 tour called Double Dream of Spring. A mostly instrumental album, it was made to fill the void until their next album would be released the following year.

Former bass guitarist Joshua Fauver died in November 2018 at age 39. He was a member of the band from 2004 to 2012.

Deerhunter's eighth album Why Hasn't Everything Already Disappeared? was released on January 18, 2019. The album's first single, "Death in Midsummer", was released in October 2018 co-produced by Cate Le Bon.

On Halloween 2019, Deerhunter released the 13-minute long single "Timebends". A separate entity to their eighth studio album, Why Hasn't Everything Already Disappeared?, "Timebends" is a partly-improvised stream-of-consciousness outpouring, recorded live direct to tape and in one take with minimal overdubs and mastered using a completely analogue signal chain.

The next day, Cox released the Myths 004 EP in collaboration with Cate Le Bon, recorded in Marfa, Texas as part of an ongoing series with Dev Hynes, Ariel Pink and Connan Mockasin.

Musical style and influence
The band has revealed many artists and genres that contribute to Deerhunter's sound. The New York Times concert review mentioned "the Breeders, Stereolab, disco rhythm, krautrock, Sonic Youth’s noise breakdowns, girl-group pop, the picked eighth-note bass lines of 1980s indie rock", as influences. The song "Coronado" from Halcyon Digest features saxophone sounds inspired by the Rolling Stones' album Exile on Main St. Cox recalled, "I wanted that sax on there because I was listening to the Stones' Exile on Main St reissue a lot...I began to see a pattern forming. Saxophones are becoming this thing. That's why we did it early. Next year everyone's gonna have a saxophone on their record because saxophones are just cool."

Deerhunter has been described as indie rock, experimental rock, psychedelic pop, noise rock, garage rock and art rock.

Members

Current
Bradford Cox – lead vocals, guitar, percussion, keyboards, electronics (2001–present)
Moses Archuleta – drums, percussion, electronics (2001–present)
Lockett Pundt – guitar, occasional lead vocals, keyboards (2005–present)
Josh McKay – bass guitar, organ (2013–present)
Javier Morales – keyboards, piano, saxophone (2016–present)

Former
Rhasaan Manning – percussion (2016–2017)
Frankie Broyles – guitar (2012–2014)
Josh Fauver – bass guitar (2004–2012; died 2018)
Whitney Petty – guitar (2008–2009)
Colin Mee – guitar (2001–2007, 2007–2008)
Justin Bosworth – bass guitar (2001–2004; died 2004)
Paul Harper – bass guitar (2001)
Dan Walton – drums (2001)
Adam Bruneau – "auxiliary drum kit in one line-up"

Timeline

Discography

Turn It Up Faggot (2005)
Cryptograms (2007)
Microcastle (2008)
Weird Era Cont. (2008)
Halcyon Digest (2010)
Monomania (2013)
Fading Frontier (2015)
Why Hasn't Everything Already Disappeared? (2019)

Touring
During live shows, Cox has worn sundresses and has performed with fake blood smeared over his face and hands, their live show being "much more savage" than their albums. In his explanation of the sundresses Cox has said, "I don't like the idea of going around stage in just jeans and a t-shirt. It seems anticlimactic."

Deerhunter have supported many bands on tour, including Nine Inch Nails, TV on the Radio, Project Pat, Liars, Yeah Yeah Yeahs, Spoon, The Smashing Pumpkins, The Fiery Furnaces, Lower Dens, Ex Models, Battles, and Kings of Leon.

See also
Atlas Sound - Bradford Cox's solo project
Lotus Plaza - Lockett Pundt's solo project
Moon Diagrams - Moses Archuleta's solo project

See also 
List of ambient music artists

References

External links

Official Halcyon Digest Website

4AD artists
Alternative rock groups from Georgia (U.S. state)
American ambient music groups
American experimental rock groups
American noise rock music groups
Indie rock musical groups from Georgia (U.S. state)
Musical groups established in 2001
Musical groups from Atlanta
Musical quartets
Neo-psychedelia groups
Post-punk revival music groups
American shoegaze musical groups
Remote Control Records artists